Hakan Eskioğlu (born 5 July 1971) is a Turkish swimmer. He competed in four events at the 1988 Summer Olympics.

References

1971 births
Living people
Turkish male swimmers
Olympic swimmers of Turkey
Swimmers at the 1988 Summer Olympics
Place of birth missing (living people)
20th-century Turkish people